The Hispaniolan amazon (Amazona ventralis), also known as the Dominican parrot (Dominican Spanish: cotorra Dominicana) or cuca, it’s one of two endemic parrots to Hispaniola along with the Hispaniolan parakeet. It’s white forehead, pale beak, white eye ring, blue ear patch, and red belly are the key characteristics that set it apart from other amazons.

It was once a common bird of the Dominican Republic and Haiti, but during the twentieth century its populations were drastically reduced. Already in the 1930s, this species was restricted mainly to inland forests and mountainous areas. Today the number of parrots is much lower, to the point of being eliminated or being uncommon in most places. It’s becoming more common in urban refuges, such Santo Domingo.

The primary method of introducing the species into Puerto Rico was the release of captive-bred birds as a planned practice for the reintroduction program of the closely related and critically endangered Puerto Rican amazon (A. vittata).

In order to determine whether the José L. Vivaldi Aviary in the Río Abajo forest would be a suitable replacement for the Puerto Rican Parrot Aviary, 30 Dominican parrots (Amazona ventralis) from the Dominican Republic were relocated there in 1989. Any modern occurrence in Puerto Rico, with the final observations taking place in 2007, is partly due to the global parrot trade.

Description 

It's plumage is green, and most feathers are edged with blue. It has a distinct white forehead and area around the eyes; some blue patches on cheeks and crown; a red patch under the chin; and black ear coverts. This amazon also has red feathers on its abdomen; blue wind coverts; green edging to the outer webs; yellowish green plumage under the tail; an upper-side green tail with yellow tips; red outer tail feathers at base; a horn coloured bill, and brown irises with pale feet. Its body length is about 28 cm long. An average adult weighs 250g (8.75 oz), and has a heavy and powerful beak.

Although a relatively common amazon, due to habitat loss, hunting, and trapping for aviculture, the wild population is declining sharply. Their ability to imitate human speech and intelligence makes them prime targets for the illegal pet trade. These amazons prefer to be either in small groups or pairs. They are noisy and cautious, spending the greater part of their days eating and resting in trees. When in flight, they have a very heavy wing beat, and are slow. They feed on fruits, berries, seeds, nuts, and possibly flowers, and constantly chatter while feeding. They have been known to cause damage to banana, guava, maize and cactus fruit crops.

Population And Distribution 
Although considerably more prevalent in the Dominican Republic, this parrot can be found throughout the diverse woodland biomes of the island. But in recent years, they have been forcibly removed from their natural environment to be kept as pets, which are highly well-liked in the Dominican Republic. There are currently between 10,000 and 19,000 individuals left in the wild, and their numbers are declining.The majority of the Dominican Republic and a small portion of Haiti are home to the Hispaniolan amazon dwindling population.

It inhabits a variety of wooded environments, from arid savanna palm groves, to pine forests and humid mountain forests, up to and a little more than 1,500 meters above sea level. It frequently forages on cultivated lands, such as banana plantations and cornfields. It is found at all elevations in forests, groves, and thickets, wherever there are suitable fruits and seeds.

Breeding 

It lays 2-4 eggs, typically nests in cavities in trees up to 20 meters above the ground, but there is a record at 1.5 meters elevation. It has also been reported nesting on rocky ledges. Breeding between the months of February and June. Prospecting pairs have been observed in mid-April, suggesting that the season may extend further in the year. 

The eggs hatch in about 30 days, and chicks usually fledge at 10 to 12 weeks of age. However, people often remove the newborns from the tree cavities, and destroy the nest that have been reused over the years, and afterwards, preventing the parrot from reproducing. Breeding in aviculture is often not successful, and when they are in pairs, they need to be isolated; this is considered the main reason for the Hispaniolan amazon's declining population. They are hard to breed, and once accustomed to being pets, can not survive if released into the wild.

Populations have been limited to forest reserves and national parks such: Jaragua, Cotubanamá, José Armando Bermúdez , José del Carmen Ramírez and Los Haitises.

Threats

The main threats to wild populations are the plundering of chicks for pet trafficking, as well as the loss of habitat due to the advance of the agricultural frontier, production of firewoods, and burning of protected land by charcoal traffickers. 

It‘s considered a vulnerable species according to the IUCN Red List. Despite the capture, trafficking and or possession of a parrot, it is prohibited by Dominican Republic’s the General Law on the Environment and Natural Resources No. 64-00.

References

External links

Species Factsheet , BirdLife
Hispaniolan Amazon videos, images and sounds, Internet Bird Collection]
https://ambiente.gob.do/wp-content/uploads/2016/12/Lista_rojaRD.pdf
http://www.grupojaragua.org.do/nuestro-trabajo/defensoria/nomedecotorra/

Hispaniolan amazon
Endemic birds of the Caribbean
Endemic birds of Hispaniola
Birds of Hispaniola
Birds of the Dominican Republic
Birds of Haiti
Hispaniolan amazon
Hispaniolan amazon
Taxonomy articles created by Polbot
Species endangered by the pet trade